Cheshmeh Pahn-e Fereydun (also Romanized as Cheshmeh Pahn-e Fereydūn) is a village in Cheleh Rural District, in the Central District of Gilan-e Gharb County, Kermanshah Province, Iran. At the 2006 census, its population was 204, in 47 families.

References 

Populated places in Gilan-e Gharb County